is a Japanese footballer. He is a striker.

Career
He was educated at and played for Yasu High School and Ritsumeikan University. After graduating from the university, he signed for Albirex Niigata FC (Singapore) from the S.League in 2013.

Club career statistics
As of 22 February 2018.

External links
 Contract with Kazuki Sakamoto
 Kazuki Sakamoto renews contract
 Player Profile on Albirex Niigata FC (S) Official Website

1990 births
Living people
Japanese footballers
Association football people from Shiga Prefecture
Singapore Premier League players
Albirex Niigata Singapore FC players
Japan Football League players
MIO Biwako Shiga players
Association football forwards